The Deserter's Wife is a 1991 French-Israeli co-production dramatic independent underground art film directed by Michal Bat-Adam.

Synopsis
Nina (Fanny Ardant), a French concert pianist, meets Ilan, an Israeli computer specialist who is on vacation, in Paris. They fall in love, marry, and, move to Israel with their son, Gili (Daniele Napolitano). Not much later, Ilan is drafted into the Israeli military for compulsory military service, as the situation in the Middle East is worsening: Saddam Hussein has attacked Kuwait with his Iraqi forces and the Second Gulf War is imminent. After Nina is accepted into the Israel Philharmonic Orchestra, she receives a call from the military and learns that her husband was wounded during a battle. She hurries to him and finds out, to her horror, that Ilan was not injured by enemy troops but by Israeli soldiers when he tried to leave his post illegally. While Ilan is wounded in a hospital and is unable to speak due to a state of shock, the accusations that he is a deserter, she finds out, are true. Despite this revelation, Nina continues to take care of him, breaks off an affair with another man, and tries to understand his motives. Their environment's reaction, however, extends not only to Ilan but also to Nina. When Nina's concert debut with the Israel Philharmonic Orchestra is about to take place, symbolically, on the day of the United Nations' ultimatum to Saddam Hussein, the social pressure grows immeasurably. Nina leaves Ilan and returns to France with Gili.

Background
Actress Fanny Ardant and cinematographer  got to know each other while filming Margarethe von Trotta's Love and Fear during 1988. In 1990 their daughter Baladine was born. Ardant and Conversi eventually parted. However, they worked together again and again, as with La Femme du déserteur, as well as in 2008, on the comedy Hello Goodbye, which Conversi produced, while Ardant played alongside Gérard Depardieu. La Femme du déserteur premiered on 20 December 1991 in France. Critic Lisa Alspector opined that "[t]his 1991 melodrama creates only generic sympathy for the disgraced, misunderstood husband, and none at all for the smarmy, selfish wife, whose motives are ambiguous throughout." In Israel, Al HaMishmar critic  underscored that "had this film never been made, it would have needed to be invented," while Yedioth Ahronoth critic Yehuda Stav wrote that the film is "humble and sympathetic, its material taken from daily Israeli experiences," and, Davar critic Uri Shin praised the film's uncompromising refusal to placate the audience.

References

External links

La Femme du déserteur at the TCM Movie Database

1991 drama films
1991 independent films
1991 films
1991 multilingual films
Adultery in films
Films about classical music and musicians
Films about computing
Films about diseases
Films about families
Films about immigration
Films about pianos and pianists
Films about psychiatry
Films about the United Nations
Films directed by Michal Bat-Adam
Films set in concert halls
Films set in Israel
Films set in Paris
Films shot in Israel
Films shot in Paris
French drama films
French independent films
French multilingual films
1990s French-language films
1990s Hebrew-language films
Films set in hospitals
Israeli drama films
Israeli independent films
Israeli multilingual films
Films about post-traumatic stress disorder
1990s French films